Round Top is an extinct volcano in the Berkeley Hills, just east of Oakland, California.

Round Top or Roundtop may also refer to:

Communities
 Kirkwood, California, formerly Roundtop, a census-designated place
 Round Top, Pennsylvania, a community adjacent to the Gettysburg National Military Park
 Round Top, Texas, a town
 Roundtop, West Virginia, a former unincorporated community

Other places
 Round Top Island (Tasmania), Australia
 Round Top Island National Park
 Round Top (Alpine County, California), the highest peak in the Mokelumne Wilderness
 Round Top (Delaware County, New York)
 Roundtop (Franklin, Delaware County, New York)
 Roundtop (Roxbury, Delaware County, New York)
 Roundtop Mountain (Greene County, New York)
 Round Top (Herkimer County, New York)
 Round Top (Livingston Manor, New York)
 Round Top (New York), an elevation in Otsego County, New York
 Roundtop Mountain (Ulster County, New York)
 Ski Roundtop, a ski resort on Roundtop in York County, Pennsylvania
 Roundtop Trail, a hiking trail in the Great Smoky Mountains National Park of Tennessee, United States
 Round Top Mountain, an elevation in Hudspeth County, Texas

Other uses
 Roundtop Filling Station, Sherwood, Arkansas, United States

See also
 List of summits named Round Top